Eddie Feldmann is an American producer and screenwriter. He won five Primetime Emmy Awards and was nominated for six more in the categories Outstanding Writing for a Variety Series and Outstanding Variety Series for his work on the television program Dennis Miller Live.

References

External links 

Living people
Place of birth missing (living people)
Year of birth missing (living people)
American male screenwriters
American television writers
American male television writers
American television producers
Primetime Emmy Award winners